The women's 60 metres event  at the 1999 IAAF World Indoor Championships was held on March 7.

Medalists

Inger Miller originally won the bronze but was disqualified for excessive caffeine level.

Results

Heats
First 2 of each heat (Q) and next 8 fastest (q) qualified for the semifinals.

Semifinals
First 3 of each semifinal (Q) and next 2 fastest (q) qualified for the final.

Final

References
Results

60
60 metres at the World Athletics Indoor Championships
1999 in women's athletics